Acerpenna akataleptos is a species of small minnow mayfly in the family Baetidae. It is found in North America.

References

Mayflies
Articles created by Qbugbot
Insects described in 1926